Dr. Lutfur Rahman was a poet in the Urdu language.

Political career
He successfully contested the election to be a Member of Legislative Assembly from Nathnagar constituency in Bihar. Later he became a cabinet minister and held two offices: Ministry of Minority Welfare and Ministry of Public Welfare Department.

References

http://www.urduyouthforum.org/biography/Lutfur_Rahman_biography.php
http://twocircles.net/2010dec23/wali_rahmani_congratulates_prof_lutfur_rahman_winning_ghalib_award.html
https://books.google.com/books?id=8JDsBBDoMccC&pg=PA171&lpg=PA171&dq=lutfur+rahman+Urdu&source=bl&ots=ii80Wbd11N&sig=YfYF3wy8MnX2pWg4-K-y2Rap84Q&hl=en&sa=X&ei=b-QJUOWqM4bJhAeYk-D_CQ&redir_esc=y#v=onepage&q=lutfur%20rahman%20Urdu&f=false
https://books.google.com/books?id=QA1V7sICaIwC&pg=PA675&lpg=PA675&dq=lutfur+rahman+Urdu&source=bl&ots=i_p5d1WOIe&sig=ziyooxxslAFXdIBPwVKPrJn95xk&hl=en&sa=X&ei=b-QJUOWqM4bJhAeYk-D_CQ&redir_esc=y#v=onepage&q=lutfur%20rahman%20Urdu&f=false
https://web.archive.org/web/20110713145430/http://khojkhabarnews.com/?p=1814

Living people
1941 births
Urdu-language poets from India
People from Bihar